"For the Love of You" is a single by the American band Earth, Wind & Fire feat. MC Hammer issued in May 1990 on Columbia Records. The single peaked at No. 19 on the Billboard Hot R&B Singles chart and No. 12 on the Cashbox Top R&B Singles chart.

Overview
For the Love of You was produced by Earth, Wind & Fire leader Maurice White and Robert Brookins. The song was also composed by White, Brookins, Stephanie Mills and MC Hammer. With a duration of four minutes and twenty seven seconds the song has a tempo of 106 bpm.

The single's b-side was a song called Motor. Both For the Love of You and Motor came off EWF's 1990 studio album Heritage.

Critical reception
John Milward of Rolling Stone said For the Love of You is "spun on a skeletal rhythm suggestive of Cameo". Andy Gill of The Independent said "Fortunately, the sinuous funk workouts like 'For the Love of You', 'King of Groove' and 'Gotta Find Out' are as good as ever." Mitchell May of the Chicago Tribune wrote "Hammer`s clipped delivery meshes so well with EWF`s leaner sound that they might want to consider hiring him full-time".

Chart positions

References

1990 singles
1990 songs
Earth, Wind & Fire songs
Columbia Records singles
Songs written by Maurice White
Songs written by MC Hammer
Songs written by Robert Brookins
Song recordings produced by Maurice White